Hathlangoo previously known as Hashmatpora is a village in the Sopore tehsil of Baramulla district, in the Indian union territory of Jammu and Kashmir. It is one of the largest villages in Zaingair. The Hathlangoo village has Janwara Village in the South, Magraypora in the North, Botingoo in the Northwest, Malmapanpora in the West and Wular Lake in the East.

Etymology

The name Hathlangoo is a Kashmiri word made up of two words: Hath means (hundred) and Langoo means (branches). The ancestors of this village said that there was a chinar tree in the village which had a hundred branches and then the elders of the village used this as a secondary name for the village initially named as "Hashmatpora". That chinar tree is still present in the cemetery of the village. Later on, with the passing of time, the secondary name of the village permanently replaced the original name.

Geography

The village occupies an area of 5.24 km2 (about 1295.87 acres).
On a hilltop on the north side is the Baba Shukur-ud-Din shrine.

Wular lake is rich in flora and fauna. The fish of Wular lake is famous for their taste and look. There are two islands in the middle of the lake.

Demographics
The Hathlangoo village has a population of 2,988 of which 1,522 are males while 1,466 are females as per Population Census 2011.

In Hathlangoo village, the population of children aged 0-6 is 388 which makes up 12.99% of the total population of the village. The Average Sex Ratio of Hathlangoo village is 963 which is higher than the Jammu and Kashmir state average of 889. The child Sex Ratio for the Hasmat Pora as per census is 865, higher than the Jammu and Kashmir average of 862.

Hathlangoo village has a lower literacy rate compared to Jammu and Kashmir. In 2011, the literacy rate of Hasmat Pora village was 63.08% compared to 67.16% of Jammu and Kashmir. In Hathlangoo, Male literacy stands at 73.21% while female literacy rate was 52.72%.

Tribes

There are several tribes in Hathlangoo Sopore village, some are native and some are refugees. The Dar and Lone are the native tribes of the village. These two tribes have lived there for many hundreds of years. Once only eight families were living in a village which includes four families from Dar tribe, two families from Lone tribe, one family from Ganie tribe and the other one from the Mir tribe.

Other tribes include Wani, Ganie, Mir, and Bhat. There are also other tribes of which the four families are from, the Shah tribes, one family from the 'Tantray' tribe,  one family from 'Baba' tribe, four families from the 'Parray' tribe. All of these tribes are refugees from the adjoining areas. The 'Wani' tribe is the biggest refugees tribe in the village. They are from the Southern parts of Kashmir which once was called the 'Maraaz'. Now they have been living in the village for many decades. This village is in the Northern part of Kashmir which once was called 'Kamraaz'.

Education

Hathlangoo village has one government-run high school and one middle and three primary SSA schools. Bilal Memorial English Medium School is the only private school. Taleem Ul Quran is an Islamic institution where boys in the morning and girls after Asr attend separate classes for learning the Quran freely. The public library has all types of Islamic books.

Places of interest
There are six mosques in Hathlangoo, two of which are Jama Masjids. All the people of this village are
Muslims. Eid prayers are mostly offered in Eidgah which is located near Dar mohalla.

Hathlangoo consists of more than twelve mohallas: from the front of the village is Nishat Colony and one of the biggest mohallas of the village is Dar Mohalla known as Danger mohalla.

Amenities 

The village has a vast land for playing. It has the biggest stadium in the Sopore block. Cricket and football are popular sports. 
Hathlangoo has produced some talented cricket players that have played at inter-college level. The Hathlangoo sports ground holds various regional sporting events. The Hathlangoo Premier League is a non professional cricket tournament held in Hatlangoo every year.

Healthcare

The village has one government-run allopathic medicine dispensary with almost all the basic needs. It has four clinics for local residents, three at Dar Mohllah and the fourth in Kuspora. Some patients prefer the healthcare facilities in the neighbouring Sopore, Baramulla towns.

Transportation

Air
The nearest airport is Sheikh ul-Alam International Airport in Srinagar which is located around 70 kilometres from Hathlangoo.

Rail
The nearest railway station is Sopore railway station which is located 15 kilometres from Hathlangoo.

Road
Hathlangoo is well-connected to other places in Jammu and Kashmir and India by the Sopore–Bandipora Road and other roads around the village.

See also
Jammu and Kashmir
Gulmarg
Sopore
Baramulla

References

External links

Villages in Baramulla district